Edward P Hardin (July 13, 1922 – May 13, 2006) was the Vice President of U.S. Manufacturing for Mobil Oil.

Biography
Edward P. Hardin Jr. was born in St. Louis, Missouri on July 13, 1922.  He matriculated at Texas A&M University.  Before graduating, he enlisted in the United States Army and served in Europe during World War II. For his valor in combat, he was awarded the Silver Star, the Bronze Star, and the Purple Heart.

After his tour of duty, he returned to Texas A&M University and earned a Bachelor of Science in Chemical Engineering in 1945. He soon began a very successful career with Mobil Oil at the refinery in Beaumont. He worked there for over 40 years, and retired in 1987.

External links
 Inventors: Hardin Jr., Edward P. and Medlin, Richard P.; Assignee: Socony Mobil Oil Co Inc

 Inventors: Richard P. Medlin and Edward P. Hardin Jr.; Owner: Socony Mobil Oil Company

1922 births
2006 deaths
United States Army personnel of World War II
American chemical engineers
ExxonMobil people
Recipients of the Silver Star
Texas A&M University alumni